The men's 4 × 100 metres relay at the 2017 IAAF World Relays was held at the Thomas Robinson Stadium on 2 May.

From the gun in the final, American Leshon Collins got some separation from Canada's Akeem Haynes.  Also gaining an advantage on the stagger was Chijindu Ujah, the British leadoff as the gap to China's Tang Xingqiang and Barbados' Mario Burke shrunk.  Down the backstretch, Britain's Zharnel Hughes and American Mike Rodgers didn't gain against China's Xie Zhenye, who gained a step on Ramon Gittens to his outside.  The second Canadian exchange between Aaron Brown and Brendon Rodney was an adventure, with Rodney hopping up and down leaving the zone without the baton.  Through the second turn, American Ronnie Baker gained a little on Britain's Daniel Talbot and China's sub-10 star, Su Bingtian to take a slight lead into the final handoff.  Britain's Ojie Edoburun reached back for the baton first but came up empty handed.  The American handoff was more awkward as Justin Gatlin slowed and grabbed twice to finally get the baton in hand.  China's final exchange was also awkward as Su ran up on Liang Jinsheng, finally getting  a successful handoff but behind a step, as USA came out with the baton in first.  With the advantage, the Olympic silver medalist sped away to a huge victory.  Farther behind, Netherlands also failed to get the handoff between Solomon Bockarie and Hensley Paulina.  Two steps behind China, Barbados made a clean exchange between Nicholas Deshong and Burkheart Ellis.  As expected, Liang was losing ground to Gatlin, behind him, reminiscent of Bob Hayes in Tokyo, a gangly running Ellis was gaining on every step, Barbados overtaking China a step out, accentuated by a dip finish.

Records
Prior to the competition, the records were as follows:

Schedule

Results

Heats
Qualification: First 2 of each heat (Q) plus the 2 fastest times (q) advanced to the final. The next 8 fastest times qualified for the final B.

Final B

Final

References

4 x 100 metres relay
4 × 100 metres relay